Shamsul Huda Khan (Died: 6 July 2006) Politician of Jhenaidah District of Bangladesh and former member of Parliament for Jhenaidah-3 constituency in 1988.

Career 
Khan was elected to parliament from Jhenaidah-3 constituency in as a Jatiya Party candidate in 1988 Bangladeshi general election. He was the chairman of Maheshpur municipality.

References 

2006 deaths
People from Jhenaidah District
Jatiya Party (Ershad) politicians
4th Jatiya Sangsad members